Omosarotes is a genus of longhorn beetles of the subfamily Lamiinae, containing the following species:

 Omosarotes ater Julio & Monné, 2001
 Omosarotes foxi (Lane, 1973)
 Omosarotes nigripennis (Zajciw, 1970)
 Omosarotes paradoxum (Tippmann, 1955)
 Omosarotes singularis Pascoe, 1860

References

Cyrtinini